Death of a Centerfold: The Dorothy Stratten Story is a 1981 American made-for-television biographical drama film, optioned by Larry Wilcox and his company Wilcox Productions. Wilcox signed the paperwork at midnight and beat out Hugh Hefner and MGM. Later, Wilcox developed the story and pitched it to MGM, where he had a production development deal and subsequently to NBC. MGM and Wilcox then hired director Gabrielle Beaumont. It is a dramatization of the life and the murder of Playboy Playmate of the Year Dorothy Stratten, played by Jamie Lee Curtis. The movie aired on November 1, 1981. Two years later, the same story was developed by director Bob Fosse in his movie Star 80, starring Mariel Hemingway and Eric Roberts.

Plot
The film depicts the life and times of model, actress, and 1980 Playboy Playmate of the year Dorothy Stratten, who was killed at age 20 in a murder-suicide committed by her estranged husband Paul Snider.

Cast 
 Jamie Lee Curtis as Dorothy Stratten
 Bruce Weitz as Paul Snider
 Robert Reed as David Palmer
 Mitchell Ryan as Hugh Hefner
 Bibi Besch as Hilda Flushing
 Tracy Reed as Mindy
 Gloria Gifford as Jean
 Hugh Gillin as Max Halloran
 Luca Bercovici as "Pooch"
 Kale Browne as Sidney
 Mark Withers as Billy Compton
 Robert Clotworthy as Floyd

Production
The TV production was optioned and owned by Larry Wilcox of CHiPs fame, and he negotiated a deal with MGM and NBC for the story to become a movie of the week. At the family's insistence, the names and relationships of her mother and sister were altered.

Reception
The New York Times critic John J. O'Connor praised the movie, writing: "the movie works remarkably well in building a dramatic momentum. Jamie Lee Curtis's Dorothy is a thoroughly understandable, if not sympathetic figure. And Bruce Weitz is extraordinary". People magazine also praised the film, writing: "Jamie Lee Curtis is just right as Stratten, and Bruce Weitz is a standout as her ex". Movie critic Leonard Maltin described the film as "exploitative".

Death of a Centerfold: The Dorothy Stratten Story  finished 27th in the Nielsen ratings. When the film was broadcast a second time on NBC in July 1983, it fared better by finishing fourth in the ratings.

Home media
The movie was first issued on VHS on September 1, 1998. It later was released on January 25, 2010, on DVD.

References

External links
 

1981 films
1981 television films
1980s biographical drama films
1980s English-language films
American biographical drama films
Biographical television films
Films set in 1980
Films set in Los Angeles
Films directed by Gabrielle Beaumont
Films about domestic violence
NBC network original films
1981 drama films
Biographical films about entertainers
American drama television films
1980s American films